The Atomic Cafe was a diner located at 422 East First Street in the Little Tokyo district of Los Angeles, California. It opened in 1946, during the post-war Atomic Age marked with a pop culture obsession with all things atomic.

The cafe was owned and operated by the Matoba family. It was founded by Ito and Minoru Matoba. The cafe was notable as a popular gathering place for adherents of punk rock in Los Angeles from 1977 forward. This was mainly because the proprietor's daughter, "Atomic Nancy" Matoba, covered most of the interior walls and ceiling with posters and fliers for punk rock bands. Music promoter Paul Greenstein frequented the cafe and promoted it among the punk counterculture scene. In addition the jukebox was a combination of punk singles, new wave music, classic rock and roll, standards, and songs in Japanese.

The cafe closed its doors on Thanksgiving Day, November 23, 1989.

The building that housed the Atomic Cafe was demolished in January 2015 to create a new subway station as part of the Regional Connector Transit Corridor.

Popular culture 

Mentioned in the lyrics to "Adolescent" from the 1978 album Electrify Me by The Plugz.

Mentioned in the lyrics to "Kabuki Girl" from the 1982 album Milo Goes to College by the Descendents.

The Atomic Cafe appears briefly in the 1983 film, Blue Thunder and in the Lionel Richie video "Running with the Night" of the same year.

A cafe appearing in the 1985 film Mad Max Beyond Thunderdome was named "The Atomic Cafe".

The cafe was featured in the 2021 Netflix animated series City of Ghosts.

References 

1946 establishments in California
1989 disestablishments in California
Buildings and structures completed in 1946
Buildings and structures demolished in 2015
Demolished buildings and structures in Los Angeles
Defunct restaurants in Los Angeles
Little Tokyo, Los Angeles
Restaurants disestablished in 1989
Restaurants established in 1946